The  is a DC electric multiple unit (EMU) train type operated by West Japan Railway Company (JR-West) in Japan on limited express services such as the Kinosaki and Kounotori from Kyoto and Osaka since 12 March 2011. 287 series EMUs were introduced on Kuroshio services from the start of the revised timetable on 17 March 2012.

A total of 97 vehicles were built. These consist of 46 vehicles for Kinosaki, Kounotori, Maizuru, and Hashidate services, formed as seven 4-car sets and six 3-car sets, which will partially replace the ageing fleet of 86 183 series vehicles currently used on these services. A further batch of 51 vehicles for Kuroshio services consists of six 6-car sets and five 3-car sets, replacing older 381 series EMUs. These entered service from the start of the revised timetable on 17 March 2012.

Design
The trains are based on the earlier 683 series Thunderbird design with increased front-end crash protection and the inclusion of crushable zones for the first time on JR-West limited express rolling stock. Livery is similar to that used on 683 series Thunderbird sets, with a maroon stripe below the dark grey window band for the Kitakinki and Kōnotori trains, and "ocean green" for the Kuroshio trains.

Formations
The various formations are configured as follows.

4-car Kinosaki/Kounotori/Hashidate sets
Sets FA01–07, based at Fukuchiyama Depot

The KuMoHa 287 and MoHa 287 cars are each fitted with two WPS28C single-arm pantographs.

3-car Kinosaki/Kounotori/Maizuru/Hashidate sets
Sets FC01–06, based at Fukuchiyama Depot

The KuMoHa 287 car is fitted with two WPS28C single-arm pantographs.

6-car Kuroshio sets

Sets HC601–606, based at Hineno Depot

The KuMoHa 287 and MoHa 287 cars are each fitted with one WPS28C single-arm pantograph.

3-car Kuroshio sets
Sets HC631–635, based at Hineno Depot

The KuMoHa 287 car is fitted with two WPS28C single-arm pantographs.

Interior
Internally, Green car (first class) accommodation is in 2+1 abreast configuration, and standard class is 2+2. All Green car seats have AC power outlets, and standard-class saloons have AC power outlets at either end of each car. The trains include universal access toilets and also women-only toilets.

History
The first 3- and 4-car sets destined for Kinosaki and Kounotori services were unveiled to the media at Kinki Sharyo's factory in Higashiōsaka, Osaka, on 26 November 2010, and delivered to JR-West on 29 November.

The first 6-car set destined for Kuroshio services was unveiled to the media at Kinki Sharyo's factory on 4 August 2011. Test running commenced from 29 September 2011. The first set manufactured by Kawasaki Heavy Industries in Hyogo Prefecture, a 6-car Kuroshio set, was delivered in February 2012.

References

External links

 JR-West 287 series Kounotori  
 JR-West 287 series Kuroshio 
 Kinki Sharyo 287 series information  
 JR-West 287 series (Japan Railfan Magazine Online) 

West Japan Railway Company
Electric multiple units of Japan
Train-related introductions in 2011
1500 V DC multiple units of Japan
Kawasaki multiple units
Kinki Sharyo multiple units